is a Japanese manga series written by Kōichi Yamano and drawn by Takashi Ina that was serialized in Shōnen Gahōsha's Weekly Shōnen King, as well as an anime series also written by Yamano.

Plot
After the catastrophe that destroyed their continent, the inhabitants of Mu have adapted to living in the ocean, in cities covered by huge domes. Many years later, the inhabitants become psychic.

During an annual battle held to determine who is the best Mu psychic, Osper, a boy with a strong sense of justice, battles Drome, an older, brutish boy who is vengeful and evil. Osper wins the battle and after being defeated, Drome destroys the dome in revenge and escapes to Earth. Osper is sent to chase Drome and avenge his people. Above ground, Osper meets Yumi Umizu, daughter of the head of a police special forces unit, the International Crusader Police (国際十字警察, Kokusai Jūji Keisatsu. With the collaboration of Umizu, who brought Osper into her unit, Osper follows the tracks of Drome to locate him.

Strange incidents occur on Earth, but on a scale never seen before. As it is revealed that Drome was a one that who was involved in all of these incidents, Osper fights him and solves each cases, whereas Drome flees every time.

After being cornered, Drome activates the ultimate weapon to destroy the Earth, and engages Osper on the place be prepared for a final battle. After a fierce battle, Osper is victorious and Drome admits defeat to him by saying, "All the bad things I've done so far are due to the fact that I was not able to defeat you and win". In his final hours, he notifies Osper of the location of the ultimate weapon. Osper immediately stops the ultimate weapon from operating, which allows both Drome and Osper to return to their home world under the sea. Chief Kaizu, who learned of Osper's return, reads a letter left by Osper for Yumi, which states "The next time I meet you, I want to be a ordinary person".

Characters

Voiced by: Keiko Yamamoto
An Mu's psychic. He comes from the undersea world in pursuit of Drome. He become a member of International Crusader Police at the recommendation of Yumi and used five types of supernatural powers to fight against Drome and the evil of the Earth. He specializes in teleportation.

Voiced by: Ryo Abe
He has supernatural powers comparable to Osper's, but he's also very brute and ambitious. He destroy and fled from the dome of Mu in revenge for losing the battle against Osper, and joins the evil of the Earth. He specializes in telekinesis.

Voiced by: Megumi Tama
She meet Osper while he was in ground and invited him to the International Crusader Police, led by her father, Chief Kaizu. She's a person who has the greatest understanding of Osper.

Voiced by: Iemasa Kayumi
The father of Yumi who is the head of International Crusader Police.

Voiced by: Akira Okuhara
A member of International Crusader Police.

Media

Anime
The series was broadcast on NTV from December 14, 1965 to October 31, 1967. Of these, the episodes ran from December 13, 1966 to October 24, 1967 were actually reruns of the previous episodes. An amount of 53 episodes were produced.

Until December 28, 1965, the series was initially aired every Tuesday from 18:15 to 18:45 (Japan Standard Time) but starting from January 4, 1966, it was broadcast every Tuesday from 18:00 to 18:30. In the first half of the broadcast, the program was broadcast without a specific sponsor, but in the second half of the broadcast with was provided by a cooperative dairy company, Kyodo Milk Industry which also sponsored in rebroadcasts until the middle of the broadcast. Later, it was sponsored by Utena, a cosmetic manufacturer.

It was NTV's first anime to have broadcast in the network. However, it has never been released on home video and is rarely featured in retrospective programs. In addition, the whereabouts of film masters for all episodes of the series were unknown until 2022 as Nihon Hoso Eigasha, which was in charge of the production of the program along with Nippon TV, and their successor Nihon Terebi Dōga had dissolved. The opening of Fight! Osper was included in the anime theme compilation Mania Aizo Han Natsukashi 〜TV Anime Tema Collection(マニア愛蔵版 懐かし〜いTVアニメテーマコレクション, Maniac's Treasured Edition Nostalgia: TV Anime Theme Collection) released on VHS and laserdisc by Hummingbird.

As of 2022, A singular episode of Fight! Opser was found and was subsequently restored by the efforts of a crowd fund on Camp Fire. The episode, "Fight! Horde of Osper Poisonous Moths" (戦え！オスパー毒蛾の大群) was found in an abandoned warehouse and given a limited release on DVD. Due to the fragility of the film itself, the film was shown only once at the Tokyo Cine Center in late 2022. As of 2023, a copy of the DVD is now on view to the public at the National Diet

Episodes

Source:

References

External links

1965 anime television series debuts
1965 Japanese television series debuts
1967 Japanese television series endings
Science fiction anime and manga
Nippon TV original programming